Santa Tecla may mean:
 A saint: see Thecla
 Santa Tecla, Italy, a commune near Acireale, Sicily
 Santa Tecla, Este, a church building in Este, Italy
 Santa Tecla, Milan, a church building in Milan, Italy
 Santa Tecla, El Salvador, formerly named Nueva San Salvador
 Santa Tecla BC, a basketball club based in Santa Tecla
 Santa Tecla F.C., a football club based in Santa Tecla